The Funky Side of Life is a jazz album released by Madlib's Jazz project under the alias of Sound Directions. It features Madlib playing different instruments under different aliases as part of a single group. This album was released in 2005 under Stones Throw Records.

Track list
All tracks produced by Madlib.

 "Directions" - 1:07
 "Dice Game" - 3:48
 "Wanda Vidal"(Marcos Valle) - 2:17
 "Forty Days" (Billy Brooks)- 5:08
 "Play Car" - 3:19
 "Divine Image" (David Axelrod)- 2:19
 "The Funk Side of Life" - 2:59
 "Theme For Ivory Black" - 3:33
 "The Horse" (Frank Brunson)- 2:49
 "One For J.J. (Johnson)" (J.J. Johnson)- 2:23
 "On The Hill" (Oliver Sain)- 3:18

Personnel
Credits adapted from liner notes.

Sound Directions
 Morgan Adams III – vocals, keyboards, organ
 Otis Jackson, Jr. – drums, kalimba, keyboards, sound effects, voices
 Derek Brooks – electric bass, synthesizer
 Joe Johnson – drums, percussion

Additional musicians  
Dan Ubick – guitar (tracks 4, 6, 7 and 11)
Tracy Wannomae – alto saxophone, flute and bass clarinet (tracks 1, 6, 7, 9, 10 and 11)
Kevin Lightning – baritone and tenor saxophone and flute (tracks 1, 2, 4, 6, 7 and 9)
David Ralicke – tenor saxophone and trombone (tracks 1, 2, 4, 6, 7, 9, 10 and 11)
Hoagie Haven – trumpet and flugelhorn (tracks 2, 4, 7, 9, 10 and 11)
Todd Simon – trumpet, flugelhorn, keyboards and flute (tracks: 1, 2, 4, 6, 9, 10 and 11)
Don Babatunde – drums (tracks 8 and 9)
Malcom Catto – drums (track 7)
D'Wayne Kelly – hammond B-3 and harp string ensemble (track 6)

Additional personnel
Madlib – production, arrangements, mixing
Peanut Butter Wolf – executive producer
Todd Simon – horn arrangement
Kamala Walker – additional arrangements
Connie Price – horn arrangement (track 11)

References

2005 albums
Madlib albums
Stones Throw Records albums